The Little Sin (German: Die kleine Sünde) is a 1923 Austrian silent film directed by Julius Herska and starring Nora Gregor, Anny Eversa and Senta Stillmark.

Cast
 Nora Gregor
 Anny Eversa
 Senta Stillmark
 Hans Lackner
 Viktor Flemmig

References

Bibliography
 Rudolf Ulrich. Österreicher in Hollywood: ihr Beitrag zur Entwicklung des amerikanischen Films. 1993.

External links

1923 films
Austrian silent feature films
Films directed by Julius Herska
Austrian black-and-white films